Coleophora orotavensis is a moth of the family Coleophoridae. It is found on the Canary Islands (La Gomera, Tenerife, Gran Canaria, La Palma and Fuerteventura).

The larvae feed in larval cases on Chenopodium hybridum.

References

orotavensis
Moths described in 1896
Moths of Africa